John Tillman may refer to:

 John N. Tillman (1859–1929), U.S. Representative from Arkansas
 John Tillman (lacrosse) (born c. 1970), American lacrosse coach
 John Tillman (policy), American nonprofit executive
 John Tillman Lamkin (1811–1870), American politician
 John Tillman (athlete) (born 1965), American triple jumper
 John T. Tilman (1845–1905), American politician in the Virginia House of Delegates

See also
 John Tillmann (1961–2018), Canadian art thief